Striations means a series of ridges, furrows or linear marks, and is used in several ways:

 Glacial striation
 Striation (fatigue), in material
 Striation (geology), a striation as a result of a geological fault
 Striation Valley, in Antarctica
 In hyperbolic geometry, a striation is a reflection across two parallel mirrors.
 In anatomy, striated muscle
 In acoustic phonetics, striations are vertical bands on a spectrogram associated with pulses of the vocal folds when producing voiced periodic sounds.
 Striations can be found in certain glasses. These have been caused by turbulent flow during teeming (pouring) of the glass.
 Striations can be observed in clouds. See Barber's pole.
 Ballistic fingerprinting